John Mellor (July 1906 - unknown) was an English footballer who played as a full back in the Football League for Manchester United and Cardiff City. He was born in Oldham, Lancashire. In his early days, he played for Witton Albion. In June 1929, he was sold to Manchester United, where he made 122 appearances without scoring. He stayed with United until 1937 when he was sold to Cardiff City. He made his Cardiff debut in an 8–1 defeat of Luton Town and stayed for two seasons before being forced to retire from injury.

References

1906 births
Year of death missing
Footballers from Oldham
People from Oldham
English footballers
Association football fullbacks
Witton Albion F.C. players
Manchester United F.C. players
Cardiff City F.C. players
English Football League players